Atergia villosa is a species of sea sponge belonging to the family Polymastiidae. It is found in rocky deep-sea habitats around the Chatham Islands, New Zealand.

This is a round, yellow, velvety-soft sponge up to 3 cm across. It is usually found attached to a scallop shell.

References

Sponges of New Zealand
Animals described in 1997
Polymastiidae
Taxa named by Patricia Bergquist
Taxa named by Michelle Kelly (marine scientist)